The United Nations Educational, Scientific and Cultural Organization (UNESCO) World Heritage Sites are places of importance to cultural or natural heritage as described in the UNESCO World Heritage Convention, established in 1972. Mauritania ratified the convention in 1981, making its historical sites eligible for inclusion on the list.

World Heritage Sites 
UNESCO lists sites under ten criteria; each entry must meet at least one of the criteria. Criteria i through vi are cultural, and vii through x are natural.

Tentative list
In addition to sites inscribed on the World Heritage list, member states can maintain a list of tentative sites that they may consider for nomination. Nominations for the World Heritage list are only accepted if the site was previously listed on the tentative list. , Mauretania recorded 3 sites on its tentative list.

Intangible cultural heritage 
Mauritania has one item in the UNESCO-List of Intangible Cultural Heritage in Need of Urgent Safeguarding: The Moorish epic T'heydinn. The epic encompasses dozens of poems propounding ancestral values underpinning the way of life of the Moorish community in Mauritania, and constitutes a literary and artistic manifestation of the Hassaniya language.

References 

World Heritage Sites in Mauritania
World Heritage Sites
Mauritania
Mauritanian culture